Steven Laffoley (born 5 October 1965) is a Canadian educator and author of creative nonfiction and fiction.

Writing 

Steven Laffoley an award-winning author of fiction and creative-nonfiction. His Hunting Halifax was shortlisted for the 2008 Atlantic Independent Booksellers’ Choice Award and the 2008 Evelyn Richardson Memorial Non-Fiction Award. Both The Devil And The Deep Blue Sea and Shadowboxing topped the Nova Scotia Bestsellers List, with the former being shortlisted for the 2012 Arthur Ellis Award for Best Crime Nonfiction and the latter winning the 2013 Evelyn Richardson Nonfiction Award. His novel, The Blue Tattoo, also garnered much critical and commercial success. "It’s a big story that everyone should read," noted the Atlantic Books Today. "It deepens one’s appreciation for the parts of the city touched by the devastation of Dec. 6, 1917."

Critical response 

Laffoley has been lauded for his signature cinematic retelling of historical events by interweaving himself into the story as a writer/detective character. Critic Thomas Hodd from the Telegraph-Journal wrote that Laffoley injects “first person, post-modern narrative as he recounts his investigative process and offers reflections on the facts as they reveal themselves.” Another critic from The Coast applauded him for his mastery in weaving together “the main story” and "contemporaneous scenes" in his books that make for "intriguing context".
Laffoley often chooses stories lesser known to the public, predominantly Canadian in subject, and almost always set around the turn of the 20th century. When asked about the inspiration behind his book Shadowboxing, he said he was fascinated with the fact that George Dixon, who seemed so influential in the boxing and wider communities of Canada and the United States, had not yet had a biography written.
According to a review by fellow writer Jenna Conter, Laffoley is the "Stephen King of Halifax" because his unique writing style gives his works a cinematic quality, both vivid and imaginative.

Personal life 

Born in Taunton, Massachusetts and raised in Bridgewater, Massachusetts, Laffoley was educated at Saint Mary's University. He moved to Canada in 1982 and lives in Halifax, Nova Scotia. He has been a lecturer at Saint Mary's University (Halifax) and a teacher in Germany, Sachigo Lake First Nation, and King's-Edgehill School. For nineteen years, he was the Head of Middle School at the Halifax Grammar School, a position he held since establishing the middle school in September 1997. In July 2016, he was appointed the thirteenth Head of School of the Halifax Grammar School.

Awards & Acknowledgements 
 Ten Outstanding #ReadAtlantic Books of 2021(Unfiltered)
 Winner of the 2013 Evelyn Richardson Memorial Non-Fiction Award (Shadowboxing)
 Shortlisted for the 2012 Arthur Ellis Awards for Best Crime Nonfiction (The Devil And The Deep Blue Sea)
 Shortlisted for the 2008 Evelyn Richardson Memorial Non-Fiction Award (Hunting Halifax)
 Shortlisted for the 2008 Atlantic Independent Booksellers’ Choice Award (Hunting Halifax)

Bibliography

Novels 

 The Blue Tattoo (2014)
 A Halifax Christmas Carol (2017)
 Halifax Nocturne (2019)

Nonfiction 

 Mr. Bush, Angus and Me: Notes Of An American-Canadian In The Age Of Unreason (2005)
 Hunting Halifax: In Search of History, Mystery and Murder (2007)
 Death Ship of Halifax Harbor (2009)
 The Devil And The Deep Blue Sea (2011)
 Shadowboxing: The Rise and Fall of George Dixon (2012, second edition 2022)
 Pulling No Punches: The Sam Langford Story (2013)
 The Halifax Poor House Fire: A Victorian Tragedy (2016)
 Mean Streets: In Search of Forgotten Halifax, 1953-1967 (2020)
 Unfiltered: An Irreverent History of Beer in Nova Scotia (2021)
 Dulse to Donairs: An Irreverent History of Food in Nova Scotia (2022)

Other Works 

 "Of Taverns and Tomorrows" in Nova Scotia: Visions of the Future, edited by Lesley Choyce (2009)
 "The Only Way Home" in Nova Scotia Love Stories, edited by Lesley Choyce (2015)
 "George Dixon" in The Top 15: Nova Scotia's Greatest Athletes, edited by Nova Scotia Sports Hall of Fame (2018)
 "Christmas Spirit" in Down Home For Christmas, edited by Lesley Choyce and Julia Swan (2021)
 "The Only Way Home" in High Water Mark: Stories from Atlantic Canada 1983-2023, edited by Lesley Choyce (2023)

References

Sources

External links 
 Steven Laffoley’s website

1965 births
Living people
People from Taunton, Massachusetts
People from Bridgewater, Massachusetts
Canadian educators
Canadian male essayists
Saint Mary's University (Halifax) alumni
Writers from Halifax, Nova Scotia
Writers from Massachusetts
Canadian male novelists
21st-century Canadian essayists
21st-century Canadian male writers
21st-century Canadian novelists